L'association femmes et mathématiques (in English: Association of Women and Mathematics), created in 1987, is a voluntary association promoting women in scientific studies and research in general, and mathematics in particular. This organization currently has about 200 members, including university professors of math, math teachers, sociologists, philosophers and historians that are interested in the "woman question" in scientific domains.

According to its mandate, its principal objectives are:

 To act for the promotion of women in the scientific sphere and more specifically mathematics.
 To encourage the presence of women in mathematical studies and more generally scientific and technical studies.
 To be a place for meetings between mathematicians and teachers of mathematics.
Make the scientific and pedagogic community aware of the question of equality between men and women.
To rally for equal representation, or parity, of women within mathematical jobs and the increase of recruitment of female math students at university.

It specifically organizes a forum of young women mathematicians, as well as conferences on different topics related to its objectives. They regularly hold a general assembly, either in Paris or outside of the city, based on various themes. It also publishes an academic journal.

The association has its headquarters at the Maison des mathématiciens at l'Institut Henri Poincaré in Paris. It participates in different initiatives with other scholarly and professional societies, in particular the Société Mathématique de France(Mathematical Society of France), la Société de mathématiques appliquées et industrielles (Society of Applied and Industrial Maths), l'Association des professeurs de mathématiques de l'enseignement public (Association of Math Professors and Public Teachers) and l'Union des professeurs de spéciales, as well as La Commission française pour l'enseignement des mathématiques (the French commission for the teaching of mathematics).

Board of the Association for 2013:
President: Laurence Broze
Vice president: Véronique Slovacek-Chauveau
Treasurer: Florence Lecomte
Co-treasurer: Christine Charretton
Secretary: Annick Boisseau
Co-secretary: Camille Ternynck

Notes

Bibliography
 Du côté des mathématiciennes, Edited by Annick Boisseau, Véronique Chauveau, Françoise Delon, Gwenola Madec, avec la participation de Marie-Françoise Roy, through l'Association femmes et mathématiques, Aléas, 2002.
  Femmes Et Mathématiques. "Nous Sommes... (We Are...)." Femmes Et Maths. Femmes Et Maths, 30 Jan. 2013. Web. 17 Nov. 2013.
  Rencontres entre artistes et mathématiciennes : Toutes un peu les autres, by T.Chotteau, F.Delmer, P. Jakubowski, S. Paycha, J.Peiffer, Y.Perrin, V. Roca, B. Taquet, through l'Initiative de femmes et mathematiques, Paris : L'Harmattan, 2001.

External links
  Official Website of the Association
  Official About Page of the Association

Association femmes et mathematiques
Women's organizations based in France
Mathematical societies
Organizations for women in science and technology
Femmes et mathematiques
Organizations based in Paris
Women in Paris